The Gers is a  long river in southern France, left tributary of the Garonne.

Its source is in the foothills of the Pyrenees, near Lannemezan. It flows north through the départements Hautes-Pyrénées, Gers and Lot-et-Garonne. It flows into the Garonne in Layrac, near Agen. The city Auch lies along the river Gers. It gives its name to the Gers département.

Toponymy 
The name of the Gers appears in the sixth century as Ægirtius, de Egircio flumine and Gircius. It is known as in flumine Gersio in 817 and as Iercius in the 13th century.

Departments and cities

The Gers passes through the following departments and main towns:
 Hautes-Pyrénées : Lannemezan, Monléon-Magnoac
 Gers : Chélan, Panassac, Masseube, Seissan, Pavie, Auch, Preignan, Montestruc-sur-Gers, Fleurance, Lectoure 
 Lot-et-Garonne : Astaffort, Layrac

References

Rivers of France
Rivers of Gers
Rivers of Hautes-Pyrénées
Rivers of Lot-et-Garonne
Rivers of Nouvelle-Aquitaine
Rivers of Occitania (administrative region)